The Order of Barbados is a national Order of honours and decorations for Barbados.

History

The first Order of Barbados was instituted by Queen Elizabeth II by letters patent dated 25 July 1980. With Barbados becoming a republic on 30 November 2021, a new Order of Barbados came into force that was established with the Barbados National Honors and Decorations Act 2021 by the Parliament of Barbados on 28 October 2021, and which replaced the former Order of Barbados that existed under the monarchy.

Order of Barbados (2021–present) 

The Order under the Republic of Barbados consists of the following honours and decorations:

Order of Barbados (1980–2021) 

The Order while Barbados was still a Commonwealth realm (1966–2021) consisted of four classes of members, two of which were subdivided into two grades. There was a limit as to how many appointments could be made to each grade each year.

When the Order of the Commonwealth realm of Barbados became obsolete, no further appointments were made with this former Order, although "all appointments, awards or decorations conferred prior to 30 November 2021 pursuant to the Letters Patent shall continue to be acknowledged as validly conferred; and all holders of appointments, awards or decorations conferred pursuant
to the Letters Patent shall be deemed to be members of the (new) Order".

Officers 

 Sovereign: Queen Elizabeth II, as Queen of Barbados (1980–2021)
 Chancellor: Dame Sandra Mason, as Governor-General of Barbados (2018–2021) and then as President of Barbados (2021–present)

References

Orders, decorations, and medals of Barbados
Awards established in 1980
Awards established in 2021
1980 establishments in North America
2021 establishments in Barbados